Melody S. Goodman is an American biostatistician whose interests include social determinants of health, health literacy, and stakeholder engagement in health research. Goodman has spoken publicly about racial disparities in access to healthcare, and is an advocate for public outreach and engagement on health issues. She is an associate professor of biostatistics and associate dean for research in the New York University School of Global Public Health.

Education and career
Goodman majored in economics and applied mathematics & statistics as an undergraduate at Stony Brook University, graduating in 1999. She went to Harvard University for graduate study in biostatistics, earning a master's degree in 2003 and completing her Ph.D. in 2006. Her dissertation, Statistical Methods for Community-Based Cancer Interventions and Health Disparities Research, was supervised by Yi Li. She is African-American, but had no African-American professors throughout her education, and her later publications have included work on the diversity of students and faculty in public health.

As well as at NYU, she has taught biostatistics at Stony Brook University, where she was an assistant professor of preventive medicine, and Washington University in St. Louis, where she was an assistant professor in the Division of Public Health Sciences.

Books
Goodman is the author of the book Biostatistics for Clinical and Public Health Research (Routledge, 2018). With Vetta Sanders Thompson, she is co-editor of Public Health Research Methods for Partnerships and Practice (Routledge, 2018).

Recognition
Goodman was named a Fellow of the American Statistical Association in 2021.

References

External links

Year of birth missing (living people)
Living people
American statisticians
American women statisticians
Stony Brook University alumni
Harvard University alumni
Stony Brook University faculty
Washington University in St. Louis faculty
New York University faculty
Fellows of the American Statistical Association
African-American statisticians